Santa Baby is an ABC Family Original Movie. It premiered on December 10, 2006 on ABC Family as part of their annual 25 Days of Christmas event. The film stars Jenny McCarthy, Ivan Sergei, and George Wendt and was filmed in Calgary, Alberta, Canada. It was directed by Ron Underwood.

Synopsis
Mary Class is a high powered businesswoman with her own marketing firm, as well as secretly being the daughter of Santa Claus. When her father falls ill near Christmas, she is forced to return to the North Pole to take his place. She employs her marketing and business management techniques to revitalise the workshop elves, and reconnects with her lost love Luke.

Cast
Jenny McCarthy...Mary Class/Claus - Santa and Mrs. Claus's daughter.
Ivan Sergei...Luke Jessup
Kandyse McClure...Donna Campbell
George Wendt...Santa Claus - Mrs. Claus's husband and Mary's father
Michael Moriarty...T.J. Hamilton
Jessica Parker Kennedy...Lucy the Elf
Tobias Mehler...Grant Foley
Lynne Griffin...Mrs. Claus - Santa's wife and Mary's mother.
Sykes Powderface...Sven
Richard Side...Gary the Elf
James Higuchi...Dave the Elf
Gabe Khouth...Skip the Elf
Tom Carey...Bob the I.T. Guy
Chris Enright...Helicopter pilot
Shannon Tuer...Receptionist
Jordan Todosey...Amelia

DVD
The DVD was released on November 20, 2007, in anamorphic 16:9 widescreen. The DVD includes special features such as Still Gallery, Trailers and English & Spanish Subtitles.

Reception
Santa Baby was a ratings hit for ABC Family, pulling in over 4.7 million viewers during its initial airing, making it, at the time, the most watched original movie developed for the channel.

Reviews of the film were generally favorable. The Los Angeles Times dubbed Santa Baby "a charming film", Mike Hughes of the Gannett News Service said it was "quite clever", and the New York Post gave it three stars, calling it "...a pretty nice movie".

Sequel
A sequel, Santa Baby 2: Christmas Maybe, premiered on December 13, 2009.

See also
 List of Christmas films
 Santa Claus in film

References

External links 
 

American fantasy comedy films
Santa Claus in film
American Christmas comedy films
ABC Family original films
Christmas television films
2006 television films
2006 films
Santa Claus in television
Films directed by Ron Underwood
2000s Christmas comedy films
2000s English-language films
2000s American films